Juan Gómez-Jurado (born 16 December 1977) is a Spanish journalist and author. He is a columnist in "La Voz de Galicia" and "ABC", distributed in Spain, and he participates in multiple radio and TV programs. His books have been translated into 42 languages and he is one of the most successful living Spanish authors, along with Javier Sierra and Carlos Ruiz Zafón. His writing has been described by critics as "energetic and cinematographic".

Born in Madrid, Spain, Gómez-Jurado worked in various Spanish media outlets, including 40 Principales, Cadena Ser, Cadena Cope, Radio España, Canal + and ABC, before publishing his debut novel, God's Spy (Espía de Dios). God's Spy is a contemporary thriller set in the Vatican, where, in the aftermath of Pope John Paul II's death, the hunt for a serial killer reveals a conspiracy.

On 27 September 2008, Gómez-Jurado won the Premio de Novela Ciudad de Torrevieja for his novel The Traitor's Emblem. Kirkus Reviews praised the novel as a "riveting thriller with a redeeming love story".

Writings 
White King (Rey Blanco) (Ediciones B, 2020)
Black wolf (Loba Negra) (Ediciones B, 2019)
Red Queen (Reina Roja) (Ediciones B, 2018)
Alex Colt, Space Cadet (2017)
Scar (Cicatriz) (2016)
Point of Balance (Atria, 2016)
The Tipping Point (El paciente) (Planeta, 2014)
The Traitor's Emblem (Atria, 2011)
The Moses Expedition (Atria, 2010. Published by Orion, 2010 as Contract with God)
God's Spy (Dutton, 2007), English translation of Espía de Dios by James Graham
La Masacre de Virginia Tech: Anatomía de una mente torturada (El Andén, 2007)
Identidad Secreta (Lago Ediciones, 2007)
Otras voces (Alfaguara, 1996)

Controversies 
Gómez-Jurado's novel God's Spy generated controversy in Spain, as the book's antagonist, Viktor Karoski, is a serial killer and pedophile priest. The book contains a detailed portrait of Saint Matthew's Institute, a carbon copy of an American institution (based in Maryland) dedicated to the rehabilitation of sex-offender priests. This led some Catholic organizations in Spain and Poland to protest against the novel. Nevertheless, critics from both countries gave the book mostly positive reviews. American reviews were also positive; Booklist, for example, praised it as a "first-rate thriller".

Personal life and philanthropy 
Juan Gómez-Jurado is divorced and has two children. He lives in Madrid, Spain. After his ex-wife was diagnosed with cancer, Gómez-Jurado became an activist dedicated to fighting colon cancer. He is also an ambassador of Save The Children. He led campaigns as "1 libro 1 euro", a website where internet users can download books in exchange for a voluntary donation to Save the Children.

List of works 
 Espía de Dios ("God's Spy", a novel), Roca Editorial, 2006, Spain. Translated into English, Danish, Hungarian, Lithuanian, Portuguese, Italian, German, Serbian, Dutch and Finnish
 La masacre de Virginia Tech ("The Virginia Tech Massacre", a chronicle), El Anden, 2007, Spain
 Contrato con Dios ("Contract with God", a novel), also published as "The Moses Expedition", a novel, El Anden, 2007, Spain
 El emblema del traidor, Plaza & Janés, 2008, Spain. Winner of the 2008 Premio de Novela Ciudad de Torrevieja

Awards and nominations 
 VII Premio de Novela Ciudad de Torrevieja, The Traitor's Emblem
 International Latino Book Awards 2011, Best Adventure Novel, The Moses Expedition
 International Latino Book Awards 2011, Best Popular Fiction Novel, The Moses Expedition
 Nominated to CrimeFest's eDunnit Award, The Moses Expedition

References

External links 

The Moses Expedition official website
The Traitor's Emblem official website

1977 births
Living people
Spanish journalists
20th-century Spanish novelists
21st-century Spanish novelists
Spanish male novelists
Writers from Madrid
Spanish mystery writers
20th-century Spanish male writers
21st-century Spanish male writers